In real estate investing, displaced sales are the opposite of leakage. Essentially, displaced sales are purchases made far out of a consumer's local economic area, even if that local economic area has comparable goods. Displaced sales are sales which come into a firm from outside. Leaked sales are sales, which are not made inside a firm, even if that firm has comparable goods.

References 

Investment
Real estate terminology